Miloš Ćorlomanović(Pančevo, September 14, 1982) is Serbian – Chinese scientist, whose origin is Serbian. He lives and works both in Serbia and China. He is an engineer of electrical engineering and a Doctor of physics, a specialist in biophysics, an competent in NMR and an expert for EMP technologies.

He is a member of Institute of Natural Sciences Lunchang (pinyin Longcheng), Beijing University, Chinese Academy of Sciences with a title of academician and a director of the ININT laboratory (Institute for Advanced Research Nikola Tesla).

His researches relates to electronics, physics, biophysics, biomedicine, bioengineering, hydrology, energetics, aeronautics and cosmonautics, as well as to quantum-information technologies.

He is occupied  by theoretical physics domains, especially torsion fields and  quantum information theory, and has several scientistic works related to this topics. He also has a few technical inventions in multidisciplinary fields and theoretical conclusions. It seems that he was the first who introduced  terms such as quantum information and quantum-information technology to physics.

His greatest discovery so far is the detection of a complex signal from the liquid water, which happened on August 19, 2017 in Institute for Biomedical Research and Bioengineering, in the Chinese city of Yantai, while he worked on clinical testing about influence of Quantum fields on anti -cancer drug quality improvement and also a  quantum information operation to the same drug as well.

References

External links  
Perspective PhD candidate ing.  Milos Ćorlomanović explains in the center of Nikola Tesla ether theory from the point of torcion fields ...
Doctoral lecture on biophysics Milos Čorlomanović of water
Emissions, Radio Tesla No.  13 on the Radio News
Emissions, Radio Tesla No.  15 on the Radio News
Perspective PhD candidate ing.  Milos Ćorlomanović in the center of Nikola Tesla, a lecture on quantum medicine, quantum information technology and programming of water
The show "Pink World" on Pink 2 by PhD candidate of physics ing.  Milos Ćorlomanović, the theme of water, the cleaning and restarting, and orgone
 Guest Academician Dr. Miloš Ćorlomanović, a member of the Institute of Natural Sciences of Longcheng, Academy of Sciences of the People's Republic of China, holds a lecture about water at the Cultural Center of the city of Smederevo. March 6. 2019.

1982 births
Living people
Serbian scientists